Lauren Powers , real name Laurie Mac Donald is an American actress model, TV and podcast host, and author who is owner of Powers Fitness event. Powers was born in 1957. She started "Lauren Powers", a bodybuilding and fitness competition in Brooklyn. Powers competed in amateur bodybuilding contests from 2001 until 2014. She graduated from Huntington Beach High School. She owned and operated a surfing academy on Maui while in college. Powers graduated from the University of Hawaii with a business degree.

Works

Contest history

2001 NPC Iron Maiden 4th Heavyweight - 2nd Novice
2002 Orange County Muscle Classic XXV - 1st Heavyweight, 2nd Masters
2002 NPC California State Championships - 1st Novice (HW & Overall)
2002 Muscle Beach Venice Classic - 1st Masters, 1st Heavyweight & Overall
2002 NPC Jan Tana Classic - 1st Heavyweight Women's Open; Overall Champion Women's Open
2003 Emerald Cup - 3rd (HW)
2003 Orange County Classics HW 1st place 
2003 California State Championships - 1st (Master Overall Champion), 4th (HW open)
2004 Muscle Beach Classic 1st Place Masters, 1st Place Heavyweight and Overall Women's Open
2010 Muscle Beach Classic 1st Place Masters, 1st Place Heavyweight and Overall Women's Open
2011 Muscle Beach Classic 1st Place Masters, 1st Place Heavyweight and Overall Women's Open
2012 Muscle Beach Classic Memorial Day 1st Place Masters, 1st Place Heavyweight and Overall Women's Open
2012 Muscle Beach Classic Labor Day 1st Place Masters, 1st Place Heavyweight and Overall Women's Open
2013 OC FIT EXPO 1st Place and OVERALL Women's Champion
2014 OC FIT EXPO 1st Place and OVERALL Women's Champion

Filmography
 "The Interview,  Seth Rogen  (2014)
 The Interplanetary Surplus Male and Amazon Women of Outer Space (2003)
 The Hollywood Mom's Mystery (2004)
 Close Encounters of the 4th Kind: Infestation from Mars (2004)
 No Pain, No Gain (2005)
 Telephone (song) (2010)  Lady GAGA
" Bigger, Better, Stronger"
  Jennifer Lopez "Medicine" Music Video   2019
  Justin Bieber  "Yummy"  Music Video  2020
 Star-Crossed: The Film (Kacey Musgraves) (2021)
 V/H/S/99 (segment: "Ozzy's Dungeon") (2022)

Television appearances
Twisted Sisters (2010 MSNBC documentary)
 Wilfred (TV series) 
 Botched (TV series)  (2015, Episode: The Bacon Bra)
 Botched (TV series)  (2016, Episode: Double trouble and a breast bubble, Episode: S05E06)
 2nd iHeartRadio Music Awards Nick Jonas "Chains" (performance) 
 2007 "Muscle Worship" documentary on the Hidden Lives series on Channel Five. 
Secret Lives of Women. 
My Strange Addiction
 1000 Ways to Die
Rhett and Link's Buddy System (2018)

References

External links
Official website

An Interview with Lauren Powers All-American Wonder Woman BodyBuilding.com

American film actresses
American female bodybuilders
Living people
Sportspeople from Los Angeles
Actresses from Los Angeles
21st-century American actresses
University of Hawaiʻi alumni
1961 births